Istgah-e Dowkuheh (also Romanized as Īstgāh-e Dowkūheh, Istgah-e Dokuh, and Īstgāh-e Do Kūheh; also known as Dohukrs) is a village in Howmeh Rural District, in the Central District of Andimeshk County, Khuzestan Province, Iran. At the 2006 census, its population was 106, in 22 families.

References 

Populated places in Andimeshk County